702 is a commercial FM radio station based in Johannesburg, South Africa, broadcasting on FM 92.7 and FM 106 to the greater Gauteng province. The station is also webcast via its website. It claims to be Johannesburg's number one news and talk station, offering news, sport, business and actuality programming and plenty of phone-in debates.

The station itself was established in 1980 and was initially a young adult music station, moving to a talk format in 1988. During South Africa's apartheid era, 702 and Capital Radio 604, were the only independent sources of broadcast news. The station is owned by Primedia.

Until 2006, 702 was broadcast only on 702 kHz AM. In March 2006, it won an application to move to the FM radio frequency, and the first FM broadcast took place on 24 July 2006. The station continued broadcasting on the AM band until 28 June 2007 when it was shut down.

702's sister station is CapeTalk, a Cape Town based AM radio station.

History
Hot on the heels of the independent radio station Capital Radio 604 broadcasting from the Transkei, which due to technical problems had failed in its bid to serve the lucrative multi-racial audience in the urban areas of South Africa's old southern Transvaal province, Channel 702 was started in 1980 by entrepreneurs Natie and Issie Kirsh in the country's homeland of Bophuthatswana, which like the Transkei was at the time independent of South African rules and regulations. The station's signature line was "In touch, in tune and independent."

Radio 702 (first called Channel 702 ) was originally based on the US inspired top 40 music format pioneered by LM Radio broadcasting to South Africa from Mozambique, and Swazi Music Radio (SMR) which broadcast from Sandlane in Eswatini with studios in Johannesburg. SMR was established and operated by the brothers Isaac (Issie) and Nathaniel (Natie) Kirsh, the founders of Primedia which owns Radio 702. Many of the early presenters on SMR cut their teeth in broadcasting at LM Radio or worked there, like Gary Edwards, John Berks and Frank Sanders. LM Radio became Radio 5 (now 5FM)
in 1975 when Mozambique gained independence.

SMR was not very successful and was replaced by Radio SR which was the first South African radio station playing entirely music by black South African and American artists. Radio SR was an instant success and broadcast from the SMR studios and transmitters. Rob Vickers of LM Radio fame was the programme manager at Radio SR. When Issie Kirsh set up 702, he appointed Rob Vickers, Gary Edwards, Frank Sanders and Stan Katz, all of whom had worked on SMR / Radio SR as well as Clark McKay who had previously worked at LM Radio and Springbok Radio. John Berks who had spent time on Radio 5 and later Capital Radio 604 joined shortly thereafter. Cocky Two-Bull Tlhotlhalemaje, a jazz musician and broadcaster was the first black African to work on Radio 702. He helped to break down the barriers between the youth of all ethnic groups.

The station's original weekday line-up was: Clark McKay (Breakfast), Frank Sanders, Jerry Cohen, Paul Stephens (Afternoon drive), Cocky "Two Bull" Tlhotlhalemaje, Zuby, & Jim Hicks. Traffic reporter Paul Beresford was included as a question in the South African version of Trivial Pursuit.  A late night rock music show was hosted by Glen O'Donovan, who was later appointed one of the station's Inhouse News Producers and Copywriters. Initially, news was only included to meet the station's licence requirements, but as interest in "independent" news grew, so did the station's news resources. The station's first news editor was former television journalist Pat Rogers, followed shortly afterwards by another former TV journalist Chris Gibbons, the latter being one of the station's current anchors. The first full-time reporter, Allan Leibowitz, was employed in 1984. The weekend lineup included Martin Woolf (Saturday breakfast show), Bill Jones, Frank Sanders and Gary Edwards.

In the early days, 702 hosted major promotions such as the Concert in the Park to benefit Operation Hunger, with a multiracial audience at Ellis Park Stadium. Over the years as the station evolved into a 24-hour news channel, it pioneered "702 eye-witness news", broadcasting full news bulletins every hour and headlines on the half-hour. Some of the other popular presenters were Mike Mills on the afternoon show; former Ireland, Lions and Transvaal rugby player, John Robbie, who began as a late night talk show host, with Talk at Ten, then Talk at Nine (currently hosted by Aubrey Masango), eventually moving to the main morning talk show; former Manchester United goalkeeper, Gary Bailey, and many others who popularised the station.  Also heard on Radio 702 in the early 1980s was American Top 40 with Casey Kasem.

Up until the late 1980s, 702 was a popular music station. The most popular radio presenter during this era was Stan Katz presenting the Morning Zoo show. The government run Radio 5 (today known as 5FM) moved from medium wave to FM Stereo in the major centres, and 702 found it could not compete technically. The station dabbled with a half-talk/half adult contemporary music format from 1989, and on 11 February 1991 the station adopted an all talk and news format, however the station retained Solid Gold and Big Band shows on the weekend. By 2016, Bandstand had ended and Solid Gold had become Solid Soul as the station changes the audience it is catering for.

In the first 12 years of operation, 702 played a very important role in bringing news and information to the people of the provinces of the Transvaal and the Free State. Because the transmitters were located in the nominally Independent homeland of Bophuthatswana, the South African government could not gag or influence the editorial and news content. To have done so, would have made a mockery of the "independence" of the homeland. This freedom of information and speech provided a platform for opponents of the apartheid administration and the station is recognised as having contributed to the peaceful transition of South Africa to the democratic society which now exists.

Members of 'banned' organisations, including the ANC itself, made use of the opportunity to use the medium to keep itself abreast of national political developments and put across its own views and stories.

The station kept pace with the changing political landscape, covering the major changes throughout the years with a professionalism and zeal that impressed even experienced international newspeople.

Name
Radio 702's name came from the AM frequency it broadcast on until 28 June 2007, namely 702 kHz. In 2006 it began broadcasting on the FM frequency and the AM transmission shutdown in June 2007. Today the station is known as 702.

Awards
May 2007 – "Station of the Year" in the first BBC "Africa Radio Awards" held in Nairobi, Kenya.
April 2011 – "Radio of the Year" at the inaugural MTN Radio Awards held in Johannesburg, South Africa.
April 2014 – "Commercial Radio Station of the Year" in the 2014 MTN Radio Awards.

Notable journalists
 Debora Patta
 Stan Katz

Shows
Early Breakfast(Weekdays: 04:00–06:00)
Breakfast with Bongani Bingwa (Weekdays: 06:00–09:00)
The Eusebius McKaiser Show (Weekdays: 09:00–12:00)
The Midday Report with Xolani Gwala (Weekdays: 12:00–13:00)
The Azania Mosaka Show (Weekdays: 13:00–15:00)
Afternoon Drive with Johanne Joseph (Weekdays: 15:00–18:00)
The Money Show with Bruce Whitfield (Weekdays: 18:00–20:00)
The Aubrey Masango Show(Weekdays: 20:00–00:00)
Late Night Talk with Aubrey Masango (Weekdays: 23:00–02:00)
SportsTalk with Marc Lewis (Fridays: 19:00–20:00)
NightTalk with Lovelyn Nwadeyi (Fridays: 20:00–23:00)
Late Night Talk with Gushwell Brooks (Fridays: 23:00–03:00)
702 Replays (Saturdays: 00:00–06:00)
Weekend Breakfast with Refiloe Mpakanyane (Weekends: 06:00–10:00)
702 Music with Kenny Maistry (Saturdays: 10:00–14:00)
702 Music with Nonn Botha (Saturdays: 14:00–18:00)
This Is Africa with Richard Mnwamba (Saturdays: 18:00–20:00)
702 Music Special (Saturdays: 20:00–22:00)
702 Music with Phushaza Sibiya (Saturdays: 22:00–23:59)
Late Nights (Sundays: 00:00–04:00)
Early Breakfast(Sundays: 03:00–06:00)
Soulful Sundays with Kenny Maistry (Sundays: 10:00–13:00)
Soulful Sundays with Paul Mtirara (Sundays: 13:00–16:00)
Soulful Sundays with Nonn Botha (Sundays: 16:00–19:00)
SportsTalk with Buhle Madulini (Sundays: 19:00–21:00)
The Midday Report with Mandy Wiener (Weekdays from midday to 1 pm)
 Afternoon Drive with John Perlman
Talk @ Nine with Karima Brown (Sundays: 21:00–00:00)

Broadcast time
24/7

Listenership figures

See also

567 KFM
Primedia
Swazi Music Radio
LM Radio
Capital Radio 604

References

External links
702 Official website

Radio stations in Johannesburg
Radio stations established in 1980
News and talk radio stations